The Time of Your Life is a 1939 five-act play by American playwright William Saroyan. The play is the first drama to win both the Pulitzer Prize for Drama and the New York Drama Critics Circle Award. The play opened on Broadway in 1939.

Characters

Main characters

 Joe, a loafer with money and a good heart
 Tom, his admirer, disciple, errand boy, stooge and friend
 Kitty Duval, a young streetwalker who longs for a better life
 Nick, owner of Nick's Pacific Street Saloon, Restaurant and Entertainment Palace
 Arab, an Eastern philosopher and harmonica-player
 Kit Carson, a teller of tall tales who looks like an old Indian-fighter
 McCarthy, an intelligent and well-read longshoreman
 Krupp, his boyhood friend, a waterfront cop who hates his job but doesn't know what else to do instead
 Harry, a natural born hoofer who wants to make people laugh but can't
 Wesley, a young colored man who plays a mean and melancholy boogie-woogie piano
 Willie, a marble-game maniac
 Dudley, a young man in love
 Elsie, a nurse, the one he loves
 Lorene, an unattractive woman
 Mary L., an unhappy woman of quality and great beauty
 Blick, a heel

Minor characters

 A Newsboy
 A Drunkard
 Nick's Ma
 Sailor
 Killer, a streetwalker
 Killer's sidekick
 Society Gentleman
 Society Lady
 Cops

Plot
The play is set in  Nick's Pacific Street Saloon, Restaurant and Entertainment Palace, a run down dive bar in San Francisco.  Much of the action of the play centers around Joe, a young loafer with money who encourages each of the bar's patrons in their eccentricities. Joe helps out a would-be dancer, Harry, and sets up his flunky, Tom, with a prostitute, Kitty Duval.  The bar is frequented by a number of colorful characters, including a frenetic young man in love, an old man who looks like Kit Carson, and an affluent society couple.

Nick's saloon is based on the café operated by Izzy Gomez in San Francisco, which Saroyan frequented.

Productions
The play was produced by the Theatre Guild. It premiered on Broadway at the Booth Theatre on October 25, 1939, closed on January 27, 1940, and re-opened at the Guild Theatre on January 29, 1940 to April 6, 1940 and September 23, 1940  to October 19, 1940, for 249 performances. Direction was by Eddie Dowling, who also starred as Joe, and William Saroyan. The cast featured Julie Haydon (Kitty Duval), Celeste Holm (Mary L.), Charles De Sheim (Nick), and Gene Kelly (Harry).

The Time of Your Life has been revived three times on Broadway: in 1940 with Dowling and Saroyan directing again, in 1969 directed by John Hirsch and in 1975 directed by Jack O'Brien.

The play was revived on March 17, 1972 at the Huntington Hartford Theater in Los Angeles where Henry Fonda, Richard Dreyfuss, Ron Thompson, Gloria Grahame, Strother Martin. Jane Alexander, Richard X. Slattery and Pepper Martin were among the cast with Edwin Sherin directing.

Adaptations

The play was adapted for film in 1948 with H. C. Potter directing James Cagney as Joe and his sister,  Jeanne Cagney as Kitty Duval.  In 1958 an adaptation by A.J. Russell was presented in a live television broadcast directed by Tom Donovan with stars Jackie Gleason, Jack Klugman, and Dick York for the Playhouse 90 series.

Awards and nominations
Awards
 1939 New York Drama Critics' Circle Best Play
 1940 Pulitzer Prize for Drama

References

External links
 
 
 

1939 plays
Broadway plays
New York Drama Critics' Circle Award winners
Off-Broadway plays
Pulitzer Prize for Drama-winning works
Plays by William Saroyan
San Francisco in fiction
Plays set in California
American plays adapted into films